Key Learning Community High School was a public high school located in Indianapolis, Indiana.

Closure

In 2014, Indianapolis Public Schools (IPS) proposed a plan to shut down the high school.  

By 2015, IPS voted 6–1 to move forward with the closure.

See also
 List of high schools in Indiana

References

External links
 Official Website

Buildings and structures in Marion County, Indiana